Darrell Sweet may refer to:
 Darrell Sweet (musician) (1947–1999), Scottish rock musician
 Darrell K. Sweet (1934–2011), American illustrator